Alexander Marxer (born 4 April 1994) is a Liechtenstein footballer who plays as a defender for Triesen and the Liechtenstein national team.

Club career

FC Schaan 
Marxer played for FC Schaan between 2012 and 2015, before leaving at the end of the 2014/15 season to join FC Ruggell

FC Ruggell 
He joined FC Ruggell in 2015 on a free transfer. He was part of the FC Ruggell team which got to the Liechtenstein Football Cup final in 2019, playing in 2 of their 3 matches including the 1:0 semi-final win over former club FC Schaan, and the 3:2 loss to FC Vaduz in the final.

International career

Liechtenstein U21 
Marxer was first called up for the Liechtenstein U21 squad ahead of their 2015 UEFA European U21 Championship qualification matches against Croatia and Switzerland, and made his U21 debut as an 84th minute substitute in Liechtenstein's 6:0 loss against Switzerland on 9 September 2013. He made his first start for the U21's almost a year later, in a 6:0 friendly loss against Belarus U21s on 4 September 2014. Marxer made in total 5 appearances for the U21 team between 2013 and 2015 and was last called up for the U21 squad in November 2016.

Liechtenstein 
On 28 May 2019, Marxer was called up for the senior Liechtenstein squad for the first time, as part of the squad to face Armenia and Finland for Liechtenstein's UEFA Euro 2020 qualifying campaign.

Marxer made his international debut for Liechtenstein on 11 November 2020 in a friendly match against Malta.

Career statistics

International

References

External links
 
 
 

1994 births
Living people
People from Vaduz
Liechtenstein footballers
Liechtenstein under-21 international footballers
Liechtenstein international footballers
Association football defenders
FC Schaan players
FC Ruggell players